The Swiftwater Corridor Scenic Byway is a Washington State Scenic and Recreational Highway in Kittitas County, Washington, United States. It follows five highways from the Salmon La Sac campground near Roslyn to Ellensburg:

SR 903 from Roslyn to Cle Elum;
SR 970 near Cle Elum;
SR 10 from Cle Elum to Thorp;
US 97 from Thorp to Ellensburg

References

External links
Official website

Washington State Scenic and Recreational Highways
Tourist attractions in Kittitas County, Washington